Carrefour Angrignon is a shopping centre in the Montreal borough of LaSalle, Quebec, Canada.  Popular stores include Hudson's Bay, Staples, Best Buy, Maxi and Famous Players. There is also a food court.  Built in 1986, it is located on Newman Boulevard, at the intersection with Angrignon Boulevard.

History
Carrefour Angrignon opened in August 1986 with 200 stores and anchors from its debut were Sears, Zellers, Maxi, Eaton's and Pascal's. 
 
The Pascal's hardware chain went bankrupt in 1991. The mall underwent changes in 1991, as the former Pascal's store became a car lot for a one-year period (Rallye Honda Lasalle) prior to being split in two to become a movie theatre. Cine Entreprise built the theatre before Cine Entreprise was itself sold to Famous Players. By 1995, Famous Players and Future Shop occupied the former Cine Entreprise space. After a succession of ownership changes, the movie theatre is now owned by Cineplex.

Eaton's closed on February 28, 1998. Eaton's former space is occupied by Staples, Sports Experts/Atmosphere and Economax.

Future Shop moved to a new standalone location in 2004; it was demolished and rebuilt as a Best Buy store. Fortune Cinemas replaced the Famous Players location in 2006, only to be repurchased by Cineplex a few years later.

The Cumberland Drugs chain, which replaced Kanes Super Drug Mart in 1990, became an Essaim in 1997, changing to the current Pharmaprix by 2005.

Target was assuming the lease of the Zellers store on November 13, 2013. Target was closed in 2015.

Sears permanently closed on January 14, 2018. This leaves Maxi as the last anchor from 1986. The 50% interest in the mall that was owned by Sears Canada was acquired by Montez Corporation. 

Hudson's Bay replaced the former Target store on August 24, 2018.

Sears's former location was subdivided in 2019 by L'Aubainerie and Ardene.

See also
List of largest shopping malls in Canada
List of malls in Montreal
Montreal

References

External links

LaSalle, Quebec
Shopping malls established in 1986
Shopping malls in Montreal
1986 establishments in Quebec